Mohamed Amer (born 12 December 1987) is an Egyptian handball player for Al Ahly and the Egyptian national team.

References

1987 births
Living people
Egyptian male handball players
Handball players at the 2016 Summer Olympics
Olympic handball players of Egypt
21st-century Egyptian people